Runt is a 2020 American thriller film directed by William Coakley from a screenplay by Coakley, Armand Constantine, and Christian van Gregg. It stars Cameron Boyce in his final film role, alongside Nicole Elizabeth Berger, Aramis Knight, Jason Patric, Cyrus Arnold, Tichina Arnold, and Aydin Etehadi.

Premise
Runt follows the life of Cal (Boyce), a teenage boy who experiences troubling incidents that make him a cold and callous person. Cal is interested in Gabriella (Hildebrand) but is being bullied by her boyfriend, Vic (Knight), and his group of friends. The character devolves into pain, self-destruction, and abuse after being subjected to bullying by his peers in high school. The film also shows the lack of adult intervention which causes Cal to grow up into an individual lacking a moral compass.

Cast
 Cameron Boyce as Cal
 Nicole Elizabeth Berger as Cecily
 Aramis Knight as Vic
 Cyrus Arnold as Borgie
 Brianna Hildebrand as Gabriella
 Jason Patric as Coach Wilkes
 Charlie Gillespie as D-Rat Ronnie
 Javier Bolanos as Big Ern
 Carson Boatman as Hank
 Gabrielle Haugh as Candice
 Tichina Arnold as Principal Carey
 Mitch Silpa as Talley
 Siena Goines as Mrs. Rose
 Vivian Bang as Kathy
 Seth Lee as Chris
 Scott Peat as Cecily's Dad
 Jacqueline Guido as Cal's Mom

Production
In July 2018, it was announced Cameron Boyce had joined the cast of the film, with William Coakley directing from a screenplay he wrote alongside Armand Constantine and Christian van Gregg. It is Coakley's feature film directorial debut. That same month, Jason Patric, Brianna Hildebrand, Tichina Arnold, Aramis Knight, Nicole Elizabeth Berger, and Mitch Silpa joined the cast of the film.

Filming
Principal photography began in July of 2018. The film was reported to be in post-production when Boyce died of a seizure in his sleep on July 6, 2019. He was 20 years old. This was Boyce's final film that he starred in.

Release
The film was released in February 2020 at the Mammoth Film Festival, where it won an award. In June 2021, 1091 Media acquired distribution rights to the film.

Reception 
Runt received a 67% on Rotten Tomatoes and a 5.9/10 on IMBD.

Available on DVD

References

External links
 

2020 films
2020 directorial debut films
2020 independent films
2020 thriller films
American independent films
American thriller films
2020s English-language films
2020s American films